William Ingle (1856 – 14 April 1899) was a New Zealand cricketer. He played in two first-class matches for Wellington in 1879/80.

See also
 List of Wellington representative cricketers

References

External links
 

1856 births
1899 deaths
New Zealand cricketers
Wellington cricketers
Cricketers from Pontefract